Welcome to Quixeramobim is a 2022 Brazilian comedy film produced by Glaz Entertainment, distributed by Downtown and directed by Halder Gomes. Assigned to the title, Monique Alfradique plays the main character. The film was shot between October and December 2020. The film will premiere at the 24th Brazilian Film Festival in Paris on April 3, 2022.

Plot 
A comedy that tells the story of Aimee, a woman in her thirties, heiress of a millionaire businessman involved in a corruption case. Forced for the first time to do without her father's money to support herself, Aimée will have to find refuge in the last family property still available: a ruined farm in Quixeramobim, in the Ceará countryside. Ashamed of her situation, she decides to start lying on social media and will discover another kind of life in the countryside.

Cast 
 Monique Alfradique as Aimée
 Edmilson Filho as Darlan
 Max Petterson as Eri
 Chandelly Braz as Shirleyanny
 Luís Miranda as Doutor Alexandre
 Silvero Pereira as Heron
 Falcão as Seu Aurenizo
 Carri Costa as Do contra
 Mateus Honori as Zé Qualé
 Araci Breckenfeld as Amelia Lima
 Haroldo Guimarães as Seu Amâncio
 Roberta Wermont as Dona Clemilda
 Valeria Vitoriano as Genésia Gilda
 Paulo Sérgio "Bolachinha" as Meiota
 Amadeu Maya  Policial Federal

References

External links 
 

Brazilian comedy films
2022 films
2022 comedy films
2020s Portuguese-language films